The 1992 Vuelta a Andalucía was the 38th edition of the Vuelta a Andalucía cycle race and was held on 2 February to 9 February 1992. The race started in Chiclana and finished in Granada. The race was won by Miguel Ángel Martínez Torres.

General classification

References

Vuelta a Andalucia
Vuelta a Andalucía by year
Vuelta a Andalucia
Vuelta a Andalucia